The Trengsel Bridge is a bridge that crosses the Trengselet strait in the municipality of Sørfold in Nordland county, Norway.  The  bridge is on the European route E6 highway between the towns of Fauske and Narvik.  From the bridge, the beginning of an old railway tunnel for the Polar Line railway can be seen just to the north of the eastern end of the bridge. The tunnel was never completed.

See also
List of bridges in Norway

References

Road bridges in Nordland
Sørfold
European route E6 in Norway
Bridges completed in 1966
1966 establishments in Norway